Redemption is an original novel based on the U.S. television series Angel. Tagline: "History can repeat itself."

Plot summary
A wealthy actress, Whitney Tyler, requests the help of Angel, Cordelia, and Doyle. She plays a vampire on a popular TV show, and a small number of viewers seem to believe she is actually a real vampire and have made attempts to kill her.

Doyle is pleased the case isn't relying on painful visions and Cordelia is starstruck, but Angel is confused; Whitney resembles someone he knew two centuries earlier.

The attempts to kill Whitney continue, while Angel, Doyle and Cordy discover a symbol that links the attackers to an ancient battle. Angel must put the pieces together.

Continuity
Supposed to be set early in Angel season 1, before the episode "Hero".
Characters include: Angel, Cordelia, and Doyle.
The story has some similarities to "Eternity" which first aired April 2000.

Canonical issues

Angel books such as this one are not usually considered by fans as canonical. Some fans consider them stories from the imaginations of authors and artists, while other fans consider them as taking place in an alternative fictional reality. However unlike fan fiction, overviews summarising their story, written early in the writing process, were 'approved' by both Fox and Joss Whedon (or his office), and the books were therefore later published as officially Buffy/Angel merchandise.

External links

Reviews
Litefoot1969.bravepages.com - Review of this book by Litefoot
Shadowcat.name - Review of this book

2000 novels
Angel (1999 TV series) novels
2000 speculative fiction novels
Novels by Mel Odom